National Highway 532 (NH 532) is a  National Highway in India. It connects Cuddalore and Chinnasalem in Tamil Nadu.

References

National highways in India